White Knoll High School (WKHS) is a public high school in Lexington, South Carolina that provides education for ninth through twelfth grades, serving the White Knoll, Red Bank, and part of the Oak Grove areas of Lexington, South Carolina, as well as parts of the city of West Columbia. The school opened in 2000 to alleviate overcrowding at Lexington High School. The school's athletic mascot is the Timberwolf.

Athletics

The school offers a number of sports including cheerleading, cross country and track, football, swimming, volleyball, basketball, wrestling, golf, bowling, lacrosse, soccer, tennis and softball.

The baseball team won the state championship in 2010.
The softball team won the first State Championship in school history and first for any women’s sport in history of the school in 2018.

Bands 
The White Knoll High School Marching Band is a 2-time SCBDA State Champion winning back-to-back Class AAAA titles in 2010 and 2011. The Band is also a 13-time Lower State Champion winning its most recent championship in 2018 while in class AAAA. 

White Knoll High School is a frequent venue for marching band competitions, hosting its annual Silver Invitational as well as AA and AAAA Lower State Championships. 

White Knoll High School's Winter Guards and Indoor Drumline compete in CWEA. As CWEA's Circuit Champions primerally serve both North Carolina and South Carolina, schools have been declared state champions while not ranking first in the compeitition overall. This is true for the White Knoll Indoor Drumline in 2014, and the White Knoll Varsity Guard in 2018 who despite placing 2nd in Scholastic A Class were declared South Carolina's state champions as the state's highest placing schools.

Feeder patterns 
The following middle schools feed into White Knoll High School:

 White Knoll Middle School
 Carolina Springs Middle School

via White Knoll Middle School:

 White Knoll Elementary School
 Saxe Gotha Elementary School

via Carolina Springs Middle School:

 Carolina Springs Elementary School
 Red Bank Elementary School
 Deerfield Elementary School

Notable alumni

 David Anderson, MiLB first baseman
 Adam Matthews, MiLB right fielder
 Aveon Smith, Quarterback for the Miami RedHawks
 Andrew Bond, Sprinter for the Nebraska Cornhuskers

See also
 List of high schools in South Carolina

References

External links

Public high schools in South Carolina
Schools in Lexington County, South Carolina